Phillip J. Brutus (born November 26, 1957 in Port-au-Prince) is a former member of the Florida House of Representatives.

Brutus graduated from Erasmus Hall High School in Brooklyn, New York. He received his bachelor's degree at the University of Massachusetts Boston in 1982 and his J.D. degree from Suffolk University Law School in 1985.

Brutus moved to Florida in 1985.  Prior to his election to the Florida House, Brutus was a member of the Miami Community Council from the Third District.  In 2006, Brutus did not seek reelection.

Brutus had announced in 2009 that he would run for the seat in the United States House of Representatives previously held by Kendrick Meek.
Brutus mentioned that the district needed a leader who understood the community’s needs and was able to implement policies that would advance its priorities.  As a law practitioner for 22 years, Mr. Brutus has represented clients in the community on a range of issues including: immigration, civil rights violation, discrimination and foreclosure defense.

Between 1999 and 2014, Phillip Brutus's campaign has been fined 18 times by the Florida Election Commission (FEC) for missing required FEC filing deadlines.
On January 26, 2016 the FEC found Phillip J. Brutus in violation of the Code Of Ethics "by failing to properly disclose his net worth, liabilities, and two real properties." On May 14, 2016 Florida Governor Rick Scott filed an executive order to  publicly censor, reprimand and fine Brutus for these violations.

Early life and family
Phillip Brutus was born in Port-au-Prince, Haiti on November 26, 1957. His father, Dr. Paul E. Brutus, was a Dental surgeon and professor at the State University Hospital School of Dentistry. An avid linguist, he also taught Spanish and German at the Institute Lope De Vega in Port-Au-Prince. From an early age, Phillip's uncle Andre Brutus, an attorney, used to take him to the Cour de Cassassion (Haiti’s Supreme Court) to hear oral arguments before that court and to "Master Voltaire’s Language", as he was fond of saying.

Phillip describes that exposure as setting him on a path to follow the footsteps of his attorney uncles Pierre Brutus, Andre Brutus and Rene Brutus. Rene ran a private school called Abraham Lincoln Academy. Phillip's aunt, Marie Therese Brutus, a high school teacher, drilled into him, the vagaries of Latin, Greek, and French composition. Phillip's mother, Marie-Therese Brun, was a kindergarten teacher before venturing into business.

Education
As a child, Phillip attended the Petit Seminaire College St-Martial (Seminaire), a prestigious private Catholic School run by the Holy Spirit congregation. Following his aunt Marie-Therese’s emigration to the US with his older sister Margaret, Phillip's father secured a student visa and sent him to New York to join his aunt and sister for the sole purpose of completing his high school education, attending college and dental school in the US. 

Upon arriving in Brooklyn, NY in the early seventies, Phillip was enrolled at the Erasmus Hall High School. Shortly after his arrival, Phillip's aunt decided to return to Haiti and left him with his older sister who was a year older than him. Phillip cites that abrupt disruption as the reason he chose not to attend his senior class prom or even his high school graduation ceremony in 1976. Because of his immigration status, Phillip was not legally allowed to work and depended on his father to cover room and board and general maintenance in addition to the first couple of years of college.

After spending two years at the Borough of Manhattan Community College and facing serious economic challenges--his father’s monthly support faltering at times--Phillip moved to Boston, MA, where a large contingent of his maternal family resided. His maternal aunt, Simone Brun-Daphnis, took him in and he credits her with keeping him on course with his education. There he transferred to the University of Massachusetts at Boston (Umass Boston), from which he received a BS degree in 1982. 

He then enrolled at the Suffolk University School of Law, in Boston. Although his mother’s family provided him with room and board in Boston, he worked as a taxi driver throughout college and law school to cover his school and personal expenses. In 1985, following his graduation from law school, he packed his belongings into a small BMW 320I and drove straight to Miami to connect with one of his cousins who had moved there a few years earlier.

See also
United States House of Representatives elections in Florida, 2010#District 17

References

External links
Representative Phillip J. Brutus official Florida House of Representatives site
Phillip Brutus for U.S. Congress official campaign site
 
The Brutus Law Group

1957 births
Living people
Florida Democrats
People from Port-au-Prince
Erasmus Hall High School alumni
University of Massachusetts Boston alumni
People from North Miami, Florida
Haitian emigrants to the United States
Candidates in the 2010 United States elections